Thomas Gates may refer to:

Sir Thomas Gates (governor) (fl. 1585–1621), of the Virginia Company, an early leader and governor of the Colony of Virginia
Thomas Sovereign Gates (1873–1948), U.S. educator, first president of the University of Pennsylvania
Thomas S. Gates Jr. (1906–1983), U.S. Secretary of Defense under President Dwight D. Eisenhower
Thomas Gates, 19th-century Tucson, Arizona area pioneer, rancher, and saloonkeeper; Gates Pass is named after him

Thomas Gates, fictional character in National Treasure and National Treasure: Book of Secrets, portrayed by Jason Earles and Joel Gretsch